= Microwave Active Composition =

Microwave Active Composition is a brand of microwave-sensitive liquid chemicals sold by Atlanta Chemical Engineering LLC. The chemical undergoes color change if it interacts with intensive microwaves. There are two major types of microwave active compositions - reversible and irreversible. The reversible composition is colored liquid and when irradiated with microwaves losses its color. However it has the ability to revert to the original one in a short time after discontinuing the irradiation. The irreversible version of microwave active composition is white (transparent if coated) and transforms itself to colored one when makes contact with microwaves. It does not revert to the original color.

The microwave active compositions are used for validating the microwave energy distribution in the microwave heat processing chambers.
